Mata Hari: The Red Dancer, often shortened on release to Mata Hari, is a 1927 German silent drama film directed by Friedrich Feher and starring Magda Sonja, Wolfgang Zilzer and Fritz Kortner. It depicts the life and death of the German World War I spy Mata Hari. It was the first feature-length portrayal of Hari.

It was shot at the Staaken Studios in Berlin with sets designed by Alfred Junge.

Cast
 Magda Sonja as Mata Hari
 Wolfgang Zilzer as Erzherzog Oskar
 Fritz Kortner as Graf Bobrykin
 Mathias Wieman as Grigori
 Emil Lind as Defense lawyer
 Eduard Rothauser as Military Auditor
 Max Maximilian as Kosaken Unteroffizier
 Leo Connard as Polizeihofrat
 Elisabeth Bach as Mata Hari's Indische Dienerin
 Dorothea Albu as Dancer
 Alexander Murski
 Hermann Wlach
 Lewis Brody
 Eberhard Leithoff
 Georg Paeschke
 Zlatan Kasherov
 Carl Zickner
 Nico Turoff
 Georg Gartz

See also
Mata Hari (1931)
Mata Hari, Agent H21 (1964)
Mata Hari (1985)

Bibliography
 Kelly, Andrew. Cinema and the Great War. Routledge, 1997.

External links

1927 films
1920s spy drama films
German silent feature films
German spy drama films
Films directed by Friedrich Feher
Films set in Paris
Films set in the 1910s
Spy films based on actual events
Films of the Weimar Republic
World War I spy films
Cultural depictions of Mata Hari
Films shot at Staaken Studios
National Film films
German black-and-white films
1927 drama films
Silent drama films
Silent war films
1920s German films